Ontonychophora is an extinct order of onychophorans consisting of organisms with simple lobopods that lack terminal feet. It includes all fossil onychophorans except †Cretoperipatus, which is in the Euonychophora along with all remaining members of the phylum.

Families
†Helenodoridae
†Tertiapatoidea
†Tertiapatidae
†Succinipatopsidae

References

Onychophoran orders
Prehistoric onychophorans
Prehistoric animal orders